Uneasy Listening may refer to:

 Uneasy Listening (Chumbawamba album)
 Uneasy Listening (Eerie Von album)

See also
 Uneasy Listening Vol. 1, an album by HIM
 Uneasy Listening Vol. 2, an album by HIM
 Uneasy Listening Vol. 1 & 2, an album by HIM